She's Just an Old Love Turned Memory is the twenty-third studio album by American country music artist Charley Pride. It was released in March 1977 via RCA Victor Records and contained ten tracks. The record was co-produced by Jerry Bradley and Pride. It would be Pride's twenty third studio recording in his career and would spawn three singles: "A Whole Lotta Things to Sing About", "I'll Be Leaving Alone", and the title track. The album received positive reviews from critics and music publications.

Background and content
At the beginning of his career, Charley Pride's musical sound was defined by a traditional country style. As his career progressed into the late 1970s, his style shifted more towards country pop arrangements. This style would be reflected in albums like She's Just an Old Love Turned Memory. The album was recorded mostly in November 1976 at the RCA Victor Studio, located in Nashville, Tennessee. The sessions were co-produced by Jerry Bradley and Pride. The album contained a total of ten tracks. A cover of Glen Campbell's "Rhinestone Cowboy" appears on the album. The remainder of the project's material were new recordings, including the title track, "The Rose Is For Today" and "I Feel the Country Callin' Me."

Release and reception

She's Just an Old Love Turned Memory was released in March 1977 on RCA Victor Records. It would be Pride's twenty third studio release. The album was distributed as a vinyl LP, containing five songs on both sides of the record. It was also be issued as a cassette to specific markets. The album spent a total of 24 weeks on the Billboard Top Country Albums and peaked at number six in May 1977. It would also become his first studio release to reach a peak position on the UK Albums Chart, where it peaked at number 34 in 1977. The project received a positive review from Billboard magazine in their April 1977 issue. Writers praised the whole album, but were especially fond of the album's ballads which they believed to be "his strength." It would also receive a four star rating from Allmusic in later years.

A total of three singles were spawned from She's Just an Old Love Turned Memory. The first single released off the record was "A Whole Lotta Things to Sing About," in August 1976. It spent 15 weeks on the Billboard Hot Country Songs chart and reached the number two spot in October. The title track was released as the second single in January 1977. By March the single had topped the Billboard country songs list. The third and final single off the album was released in May 1977, "I'll Be Leaving Alone." It spent 14 weeks on the country chart and would peak at number one. All three singles would also reach number one on the RPM Country Singles chart in Canada.

Track listings

Vinyl version

Cassette version

Digital version

Personnel
All credits are adapted from the liner notes of She's Just an Old Love Turned Memory.

Musical and technical personnel
 Jerry Bradley – producer
 The Jordanaires – background vocals
 The Nashville Edition – background vocals
 Charley Pride – lead vocals, producer

Charts

Weekly charts

Year-end charts

Release history

References

1977 albums
Albums produced by Jerry Bradley (music executive)
Albums produced by Charley Pride
Charley Pride albums
RCA Victor albums